The 2020 World Touring Car Cup was the third season of the World Touring Car Cup and 16th overall of the series, which dates back to the 2005 World Touring Car Championship.

The drivers' championship was won by Yann Ehrlacher. The teams' championship was won by Cyan Racing Lynk & Co.

Teams and drivers

Summary 
JAS Motorsport and Honda Racing retained their 2019 drivers – Attila Tassi, Tiago Monteiro, Néstor Girolami and Esteban Guerrieri – for the 2020 season. On 5 March it was announced that all four drivers would compete for Münnich Motorsport, which would expand from two cars last season. To meet series regulations the team was split into two entities – ALL-INKL.DE Münnich Motorsport and ALL-INKL.COM Münnich Motorsport – with driver pairings yet to be confirmed. On 2 June it was announced that Attila Tassi and Tiago Monteiro would join the ALL-INKL.DE Münnich Motorsport with Néstor Girolami and Esteban Guerrieri remaining at the ALL-INKL.COM Münnich Motorsport.

Volkswagen Motorsport announced that it would cease manufacturer support for the Golf GTI TCR along with all petrol-powered motorsport programmes, though the Golf GTI TCR would still be available to private teams. This announcement came along with the shift of the brand's policy towards electric racing. Sébastien Loeb Racing, which had run four Golf GTI TCR cars during the 2019 season, announced on 31 January 2020 that it would leave the series.

Audi opted not to introduce a successor to the RS 3 LMS for 2020, while also ending their manufacturer support in the series, though the RS 3 LMS would still be available to private teams. Days before the announcement, W Racing Team, competing under the Audi Sport Team Leopard Racing banner, announced that it would cease participation in the series after the 2019 season to focus on their racing programmes in GT racing and the Deutsche Tourenwagen Masters.

Tom Coronel remained with Comtoyou Racing, but switched from the Cupra León TCR to the Audi RS 3 LMS TCR. Nathanaël Berthon returned to the WTCR driving for Comtoyou Racing.

Cyan Racing committed to run four Lynk & Co 03 TCR cars for the season. On 26 March Yann Ehrlacher and Yvan Muller were confirmed as drivers for Cyan Racing Lynk & Co.

Hyundai was again represented by four Hyundai i30 N TCR entries. BRC Racing Team scaled down to two cars after fielding all four entries last year, and entered under the BRC Hyundai N Lukoil Squadra Corse banner with reigning champion Norbert Michelisz and Gabriele Tarquini. Engstler Motorsport returned to the series for the first time since the 2014 season (back when it was called the World Touring Car Championship) fielding the remaining two Hyundai cars under the Engstler Hyundai N Liqui Moly Racing Team name for Luca Engstler —who made his full-season début after entering once as a wildcard entry for the 2019 season as well as being replacement for Augusto Farfus at the Macau race weekend last year— and Nicky Catsburg. With these changes, Farfus left the team.

SEAT Cupra announced on 3 April 2020 that they would not offer manufacturer support to any team in the 2020 Championship, though the new León Competición TCR would still be available to private teams. On 14 May 2020, it was announced that the Cupra Leon Competición TCR would compete in the championship, with teams and drivers yet to be named. On 30 May 2020, it was announced that Zengő Motorsport would return to the WTCR, running two new León Competición TCR cars, for Bence Boldizs and a yet-to-be-named driver. It was announced on 28 August that he would be joined by Mikel Azcona and  Gábor Kismarty-Lechner in a three-car lineup.

Jean-Karl Vernay switched from W Racing Team to Team Mulsanne, which run a single Alfa Romeo Giulietta Veloce TCR.

Vuković Motorsport joined the grid running a single Renault Mégane R.S. TCR for Jack Young. Aurélien Comte later replaced Young from the Slovakia Race onwards, thereby switching from DG Sport Compétition to Vuković Motorsport.

Calendar

A provisional calendar was released on 5 December 2019.

The 2020 championship was contested over 16 races in six rounds in Europe. The season was originally planned to be contested over 20 races in 10 rounds, but this changed due to the COVID-19 pandemic.

Rule changes

Technical changes 
 Compensation weight was measured differently compared to the previous season with now only the qualifying laps counted. Previously a combination of both the qualifying and race laps was used to determine the compensation weight. The change came to avoid teams instructing drivers to set slower race laps. The Balance of Performance parameters for the cars remains unaffected.
 Goodyear became the series' tyre supplier, replacing Yokohama after a fourteen-year tenure as Yokohama elected to concentrate on developing tyres for the Super Formula and Super GT championships. Teams had a set of 18 new tyres for the opening round of the season, with the number being decreased to 12 for the remaining rounds.

Sporting changes 
 For the first time since the 2010 World Touring Car Championship, a rookie category was introduced in the series. Drivers under the age of 23 were eligible as long as they had not raced in more than three race weekends in the series prior to this season.
 The three-race schedule that had been in use for the previous two seasons, was cut down to two, citing cost-cutting measures, reducing the number of races from thirty to twenty. As a result, only a single qualifying session would be held. The race length for Race 2 would be three laps longer than Race 1 as a direct result of the reduced number of events. After just two rounds the series reverted to the three race format from the Race of Slovakia onwards.
 Teams running two cars were restricted to 12-man personnel with three-car teams allowed 18-man personnel. The number of personnel working on the cars, wearing designated armbands, was restricted to ten. In light of the economical situation caused by the COVID-19 pandemic, teams were allowed to enter just one car for the 2020 season, though they would not be eligible to score points in the teams' championship.
 The WTCR Trophy was introduced for the 2020 season. Drivers who did not have financial support from customer racing department and haven't won the championship in either WTCR or its predecessor —the World Touring Car Championship— were allowed to score points in the WTCR Trophy.

Results

Championship standings
Scoring system

Scoring system for WTCR Trophy

Drivers' championship

† – Drivers did not finish the race, but were classified as they completed over 75% of the race distance.

Teams' championship

† – Drivers did not finish the race, but were classified as they completed over 75% of the race distance.

Rookies' championship

WTCR Trophy
Eligible for drivers racing without manufacturer support.

Notes

References

External links
 

2020 in motorsport
2020 in TCR Series
2020
World Touring Car Cup